The 2021 Liga 3 Bangka Belitung is a qualifying round for the national round of 2021–22 Liga 3, The lowest tier in Indonesian football league system.

Persibabar West Bangka, the winner of the 2019 Liga 3 Bangka Belitung are the defending champions.

Teams
There are 13 teams participated in the league this season, divided into 2 groups.

Group stage

Group A 
 All matches are played in Orom Stadium, Sungailiat, Bangka Belitung.

Group B 
 All matches are played in Pangkallalang Stadium, Tanjung Pandan, Bangka Belitung.

Knockout stage 
All times were local, WIB (UTC+7).

Bracket

Quarter finals

Semi finals

Third place

Final

References

Liga 3
Bangka Belitung Islands